The Abijah Thomas House is an historic octagon house located southwest of Marion, Virginia, United States, on VA 657. Built in 1856, it was added to the National Register of Historic Places on  November 28, 1980.

Architecture

The Abijah Thomas House is an octagon house, which is part of the trend of octagon architecture of 1850s America. The building consists of seventeen rooms, ten closets, and a storage room. The exterior walls are made of brick, which were made by slaves on the property. Interior design wise, the house features a rare example of painted ashlar upon plaster wall. Other interior touches include  graining, marbleizing and stenciling.

History

The house was completed in 1857, for Abijah Thomas of Smyth County, who was a property and slave owner, and the owner of a textile plant. The house and the property around it consisted of 400 acres, and was assessed at being worth $5,000 in 1857.

Today

The house sat abandoned for many years and is currently owned by a local resident who seeks to renovate it back to its historical style. Ghosts have been reported as being seen on site, specifically in the home's storage room, called the "dark room," by locals. Reports have claimed the appearance of abused slaves, including the sound of shackles moving and blood dripping down interior walls. Despite local beliefs that slaves were abused within the "dark room," historian Mark Sturgill believes that stains on the floorboards of the storage room were caused by food spills from canned jars kept in the room, not from blood stains.

Images

Further reading
 Sturgill, Mack Howard (1990); Abijah Thomas & His Octagonal House, Published by M.H.Sturgill

References

External links

Abijah Thomas House, Thomas Bridge Road, Marion, Smyth County, VA: 13 measured drawings at Historic American Buildings Survey

Historic American Buildings Survey in Virginia
Houses in Smyth County, Virginia
Houses completed in 1856
Houses on the National Register of Historic Places in Virginia
National Register of Historic Places in Smyth County, Virginia
Octagon houses in Virginia